Sprog may refer to:

 Sprog, son of the fictional character Max Rockatansky (Mad Max)
 Sprog (software), a graphical tool for Perl programs
 SPROG, a Sierra club summer training program for youth
 Sprog, nickname for snooker player Mark Williams

See also
 Sprogg, a character in the TV series Rupert